Jeong Yak-jong (1760 – 8 April 1801), also known as Augustine Chong, was a Korean Catholic martyr who contributed greatly to the spread of Catholicism in Korea. He was the older brother of Jeong Yak-yong and the father of Paul Chong Hasang. 

He wrote the first Catholic catechism using only Korean letters so that he could reach out to the common people as well as the nobles who were the only ones in Korean society who could read Chinese characters. He was first converted to Catholicism himself by the Chinese priest Chou Wen-Mu.

References

1760 births
1801 deaths
18th-century venerated Christians
19th-century venerated Christians
Converts to Roman Catholicism
19th-century Roman Catholic martyrs
Korean beatified people
People from Gwangju, Gyeonggi
18th-century Korean people
Beatifications by Pope Francis